This is a list of all the 194 American golfers who have played in the Ryder Cup through 2021. Phil Mickelson holds the record with 12 appearances.

Players 

 ^ In the final team but did not play in any matches.

 + Selected or qualified for the team but withdrew and was replaced. Tom Watson left the day before play began to be at the birth of his first child and was replaced by Mark Hayes.

Playing record 
Source:

W = Matches won, L = Matches lost, H = Matches halved

In this table the appearances includes players who were in the final team but were not selected for any matches. It does not include those who were initially selected or who qualified but were later replaced. Thus Tom Watson (1979) is excluded.

Record American Ryder Cup point winners

Family relationships
The following American Ryder Cup players are or have been related:

 Joe Turnesa and Jim Turnesa were brothers.
 Jay Hebert and Lionel Hebert were brothers.
 Sam Snead was the uncle of J. C. Snead.
 Bob Goalby was the uncle of Jay Haas. Haas's mother Shirley was the sister of Goalby.
 Jack Burke Jr. and Dave Marr were second cousins.
 Bruce Lietzke and Jerry Pate were brothers-in-law. Lietzke's wife, Rose, and Pate's wife, Soozi, are sisters. They played together in the 1981 Ryder Cup.

See also 

Golf in the United States
List of European Ryder Cup golfers
List of American Presidents Cup golfers
Lists of golfers

References

External links
PGA Media Guide 2012
About.com golf Ryder Cup Records

 
 Ryder Cup
Ryder Cup
Ryder
Golf
American
Ryder Cup, American